The following lists events that happened during 1990 in Cape Verde.

Incumbents
President: Aristides Pereira
Prime Minister: Pedro Pires

Events
March 14: The Movement for Democracy political party established
June 23 census: Population: 355,278

Arts and entertainment
Cesária Évora's album Distino di Belita released

Sports
CS Mindelense won the Cape Verdean Football Championship

Births
January 8: Ryan Mendes, footballer
March 23: Wuilito Fernandes, soccer player
May 12: Gilson Varela, footballer
May 18: Luis Germano Pires Lopes de Almeida (Kiki Ballack), footballer

References

 
Years of the 20th century in Cape Verde
1990s in Cape Verde
Cape Verde
Cape Verde